Miss Europe 1995 was the 50th edition of the Miss Europe pageant and the 39th edition under the Mondial Events Organization. It was held in Istanbul, Turkey on October 23, 1995. Monika Žídková of the Czech Republic, was crowned Miss Europe 1995 by out going titleholder Lilach Ben-Simon of Israel.

Results

Placements

Contestants 

 - Monika Zguro
 - Cornalia Hatzl
 - Natalia Makei
 - Vanessa Minique
 - Guergana Karadjova
 - Monika Žídková
 - Mille Sandgren
 - Angie Bowness
 - Kadri Kont-Kontson
 - Miia Puoskari
 -  Sophie Bourger
 - Ilka Endres
 - Johanna Mavredaki
 - Kaysa de Haan
 - Krisztina Dallos
 - Hrafnhildur Hafsteinsdóttir
 - Anna Maria McCarthy
 - Yana Kalman
 - Barbara Cioni
 - Ilze Širiņa
 - Danguolė Leskevičiūtė
 - Paola Roberto
 - Janet Gould
 - Ingeborg Dossland
 - Magdalena Pęcikiewicz
 - Adriana Iria
 - Irena Aldea
 - Ilmira Shamsutdinova
 - Tracy West
 - Jana Budovičová
 - Ana Martínez Conde
 - Sofie Tocklin
 - Veronique Kreen
 - Beste Açar
 - Vlada Litovchenko
 - Liza Warner

Notes

Debuts

Returns

References

External links 
 

Miss Europe
1995 beauty pageants
1995 in Turkey
October 1995 events in Turkey